Aspen Estates, Alberta may refer to:

Aspen Estates, Beaver County, Alberta, a locality in Beaver County, Alberta
Aspen Estates, Parkland County, Alberta, a locality in Parkland County, Alberta